BEHS Minbya  is the only high school in Minbya, the westernmost part of Myanmar.

External links
Satellite map at Maplandia.com

References

Secondary schools in Myanmar
Rakhine State